Williams is an unincorporated community and census-designated place (CDP) in Josephine County, Oregon, United States. As of the 2010 census it had a population of 1,072.

There were three different post offices in the area named for their proximity to Williams Creek: Williams, Williamsburg and Williams Creek (in Jackson County). Williams Creek, which flows into the Applegate River, was named for Captain Robert Williams, who fought against Rogue River Indians along the creek during the Rogue River Wars of 1855–6. Williams post office was established in 1881 and is about six miles upstream from Provolt on Williams Creek, and two miles west of the Jackson-Josephine county line. The community is served by the Three Rivers School District; Williams Elementary School is located in the community.

Geography
Williams is in southeastern Josephine County, in the valley of Williams Creek, a north-flowing tributary of the Applegate River and part of the Rogue River watershed.

Demographics

Climate
This region experiences warm (but not hot) and dry summers, with no average monthly temperatures above 71.6 °F.  According to the Köppen Climate Classification system, Williams has a warm-summer Mediterranean climate, abbreviated "Csb" on climate maps.

Notable residents
 Steve Miller, musician - from 1976 to 1986, Miller owned the Lippincott-Wagner House and a  ranch here. In 2015, it was placed on the National Register of Historic Places.

See also
Applegate Valley
Rogue Valley
Siskiyou Mountains

References

Populated places established in 1881
Unincorporated communities in Josephine County, Oregon
Census-designated places in Oregon
1881 establishments in Oregon
Unincorporated communities in Oregon